Martin Frese (born 4 January 1998) is a Danish professional footballer who plays as a left-back for FC Nordsjælland.

Club career

Early years
Frese started his career at local club BK Frem, but joined FC Nordsjælland at the age of 15.

Nordsjælland
Frese got his first senior call up on 31 March 2017, where he sat on the bench for the whole game against Lyngby Boldklub.

He got his debut for FC Nordsjælland on 5 May 2017. Frese was in the starting lineup, but got replaced by Patrick da Silva after only 35 minutes due to an injury in a 1-1 draw against F.C. Copenhagen in the Danish Superliga. Frese suffered an anterior cruciate ligament injury and was expected a break for 12 months. However, his contract got extended and he was promoted to the first team squad for the 2017/18 season. Frese got his contract extended in July 2018 until 2021. After four games in the 2018/19 season, Frese got injured in February 2019 and was out for the rest of the season.

From the 2020–21 season, Frese was used as a left-back for Nordsjælland. After a good individual season for Frese, he signed a contract extension on 16 July 2021, signing until June 2022. Frese was also handed shirt number 5.

References

External links
 
 Martin Frese at FCN

1998 births
Living people
Danish men's footballers
Association football defenders
Danish Superliga players
Boldklubben Frem players
FC Nordsjælland players
People from Rødovre
Sportspeople from the Capital Region of Denmark